Bolivar Edwards Kemp Jr. (September 23, 1904 – October 27, 1965), was the  attorney general of Louisiana from 1948 to 1952 during the administration of Louisiana Governor Earl Kemp Long. A Democrat, Kemp was allied with the Long faction in state politics.

References

1904 births
1965 deaths
Tulane University Law School alumni
Louisiana Attorneys General
Kemp family
People from Amite City, Louisiana
Politicians from New Orleans
Louisiana Democrats
Lawyers from New Orleans
20th-century American lawyers
20th-century American politicians
Burials in Louisiana